Larry Dan Tidwell  (born May 14, 1953), is the Head Coach for the Dallas Christian College Woman’s Basketball Team.   Before moving to Kansas, he served as women's basketball head coach from 2013–2018 at the University of Texas Rio Grande Valley, having been retained when his former institution, the University of Texas–Pan American (UTPA), merged with the University of Texas at Brownsville (UTB). Prior to his position at UTPA/UTRGV, he was head coach of the Lamar Lady Cardinals basketball team for six seasons from 2007–2013 as well as also Lamar athletics director from June 2010 to May 2011.

Coaching

Tidwell is a coaching veteran of over 35 years and has worked in the Big 12 Conference, Western Athletic Conference, Conference USA, the former Southwest Conference and the Southland Conference. He is credited with helping sign, develop and coach more than 20 student athletes who have taken their talents to the professional level, the most recent being Tamara Albalde who was the Southland Conference's Freshman of the Year in 2007–08 and a first-team all-conference selection before signing with a team in her native Spain, in addition to playing for the Spanish National Team in the 2008 Olympics.

Baylor
During Tidwell's tenure at Baylor, the Lady Bears' recruiting classes were twice recognized among the Top 25 in the nation. In all, 12 of his 17 college recruiting classes have been ranked among the nation's Top 40.

TCU
Tidwell went to TCU after a brief stint as an assistant coach at the University of South Florida. He also spent six seasons as an assistant coach at Baylor University, helping the Bears win 35 games over his final two seasons and securing a Women's National Invitation Tournament berth. Tidwell was instrumental in bringing in TCU's 2000 recruiting class, which was ranked 22nd in the country. His dedicated work continued as the Lady Frogs' 2001 class was ranked as high as fourth nationally, making it the most highly touted in the program's history. The Lady Frogs' 2003 class was also ranked in the Top 10.

Lamar
Tidwell came to Lamar in 2007 after serving eight seasons as an assistant coach and recruiter at TCU, helping the Lady Frogs achieve 173 victories and seven consecutive NCAA Tournament appearances. In addition to finishing the regular season 1st in the conference East division, Tidwell's first Lamar team pulled off a stunner by advancing to the championship game of the 2008 Southland Conference Tournament with wins of 60–48 over preseason favorite Stephen F. Austin and 63–50 over Texas A&M–Corpus Christi Islanders. The Lady Cardinals again defeated Stephen F. Austin in the first round of the 2009 tournament before falling to Texas–Arlington in the semifinals.

In the 2009–10 season, the Lady Cardinals posted a 26–8 overall record and a 13–3 mark in the Southland Conference. Lamar won the Southland Conference regular-season and tournament titles, as the Lady Cards advanced to the NCAA Tournament for the first time since 1991. The 26 wins were the second-most in school history. Tidwell was named the Texas Basketball Coaches Association Division I Women's Basketball Coach of the Year for his efforts.   One of Tidwell's 2009–10 players, Jenna Plumley, was named Southland Conference Player of the Year and Newcomer of the Year.  Plumley was among the national leaders in 3–pointers, assists and steals.

The Lady Cardinals almost matched the 2009–10 record the following season finishing 25–8 overall and 13–3 in conference.  The Lady Cardinals also competed in the WNIT.

After his Lady Cardinals competed in the 2013 Women's Basketball Invitational tournament finishing the season with a 22–11 overall record, Larry Tidwell resigned as Lady Cardinals head basketball coach on April 4, 2013 to take a similar position at Texas–Pan American.

Tidwell's teams had a 128–66 overall record in his six seasons as head coach of the Lady Cardinals.  He ranks first on Lamar's all-time list for wins.

Texas-Pan American and UTRGV
Tidwell came to UTPA in 2013 after serving six seasons as head coach of the Lamar Lady Cardinals basketball team.  He left Lamar as that program's winningest coach in school history winning 128 victories and making three post season appearances (NCAA, WNIT, and WBI).  In his first season at Texas-Pan American, his team tied program records for wins in a season and for conference wins in a season.  Tidwell's 2014–15 team showed continued improvement finishing the season with a 19–15 overall record and a conference record of 9–5.  Competing in the 2015 WAC women's basketball tournament, the Broncs reached the championship game where they fell to New Mexico State.  Under Coach Tidwell, the Broncs received an invitation to the 2015 Women's Basketball Invitational, the first postseason invitation in the program's history.

The 2014–15 season was the last for UTPA as an institution. At the end of that school year, a merger between UTPA and UTB, which had been approved in 2013, was finalized, and UTRGV entered into full operation. The UTPA athletic program was directly transferred to UTRGV.

Head coaching record

Awards
In 2010, the Texas Association of Basketball Coaches (TABC) named Tidwell "Division I Coach of the Year" for women's college basketball.  The honor was repeated at the conclusion of the 2014–15 season with Tidwell being honored as the TABC "Division I Coach of the Year" for women's division I basketball for a second time.

In 2008, Tidwell was the recipient of the TGCA's prestigious Margaret McKown Distinguished Service Award for his then 32 years of service to the organization. He also has worked as assistant director of the TABC summer camps for girls. Named "Teacher of the Year" on two occasions, he was honored as Schulenburg's "Citizen of the Year" in 1991.

In 2002, he earned AFLAC National Assistant Coach of the Year.

A member of the Austin College and Sanger H.S. Halls of Fame.

References

Further reading

1953 births
Living people
People from Sanger, Texas
Sportspeople from the Dallas–Fort Worth metroplex
Basketball players from Texas
American men's basketball players
TCU Horned Frogs men's basketball players
Austin College alumni
Basketball coaches from Texas
American women's basketball coaches
High school basketball coaches in Texas
Baylor Bears women's basketball coaches
TCU Horned Frogs women's basketball coaches
Lamar Lady Cardinals basketball coaches
Lamar Cardinals and Lady Cardinals athletic directors
UT Rio Grande Valley Vaqueros women's basketball coaches
Kansas Jayhawks women's basketball coaches